The Anglican Church of St Nicholas in Kittisford, Somerset, England was built around 1500. It is a Grade II* listed building.

History

The church was built between 1480 and 1500 after Cothay Manor was constructed. Some of the fabric of an earlier church on the site may still survive. It is believed that the Bluett family were responsible for its construction. 

It was expanded in the mid 17th century including the construction of the north chapel. It had a Victorian restoration in 1875.

The parish is part of the Wellington and District benefice within the Diocese of Bath and Wells.

Architecture

The church is built of red sandstone with tiled roofs. It consists of a three-bay nave, south aisle and south porch. The three-stage west tower has a parapet and is supported by buttresses. The tower had three bells.

Inside the church is a wooden pulpit built in 1616.

See also  
 List of ecclesiastical parishes in the Diocese of Bath and Wells

References

Grade II* listed buildings in Taunton Deane
Grade II* listed churches in Somerset